Lalmai Chandi Temple, also called Chandimura Mandir, is an ancient Hindu temple located on the summit of the Lalmai hill in Barura Upazila of Comilla District, Bangladesh. The temple is dedicated to the Goddess Kali. There is a temple dedicated to the God Shiva nearby.

References

History 
Establishment: 7th-century Founder: Rani Probhaboti, Wife of Buddhist Moharaj.

First Renovation: 17th-century reformer and excavator of Dutia Deeghi, Diteea Debi, Niece of Moharaj Manikko Bahadur, The greatest king of Tripura . 

Second Renovation: 1972-1973 AD Reformer and development organizer: Swami Atmanada Geeri Moharaj.

Hindu temples in Chittagong Division
Cumilla